Chinmoy Roy (1940–2019) was an Indian Bengali male actor. He was famous for his comic roles in Bengali movies, though his versatility has allowed him to play a variety of roles.

Though he was known for portraying various character roles, Roy was equally at ease in portraying the famous fictional character Tenida on screen. He held his own among prominent performers like Soumitra Chatterjee, Robi Ghose and Tarun Kumar in the comedies Basanto Bilap, Dhonni Meye, and Nanigopaler Biye. He was also seen in a small role in Satyajit Ray's Goopy Gyne o Bagha Byne, in which he portrayed a spy working for the Minister of Halla. Roy had to contend with chronic health problems. Nonetheless, he had been working on a script for a film called Sudama- The Half Man. The film is directed by Indo-Australian director Rajib Ball, and Roy also planned on working on a few more scripts with the same director.

Death
Roy died at the age of 79 in Kolkata on 17 March 2019 at about 10:10 p.m., from a heart attack.

Filmography

References

External links
 

Bengali male actors
Male actors in Bengali cinema
2019 deaths
Indian male film actors
20th-century Indian male actors
People from Comilla
1940 births
Maharaja Manindra Chandra College alumni
University of Calcutta alumni